Kupriyanovo is a rural locality (a selo) in Novochesnokovsky Selsoviet of Mikhaylovsky District, Amur Oblast, Russia. The population was 124 as of 2018. There are 6 streets.

Geography 
Kupriyanovo is located on the left bank of the Amur River, 41 km southeast of Poyarkovo (the district's administrative centre) by road. Novochesnokovo is the nearest rural locality.

References 

Rural localities in Mikhaylovsky District, Amur Oblast